HMCS Shediac was a  of the Royal Canadian Navy during the Second World War. She served primarily in the Battle of the Atlantic as a convoy escort. She was named after the town of Shediac, New Brunswick.

Background

Flower-class corvettes like Shediac serving with the Royal Canadian Navy during the Second World War were different from earlier and more traditional sail-driven corvettes. The "corvette" designation was created by the French for classes of small warships; the Royal Navy borrowed the term for a period but discontinued its use in 1877. During the hurried preparations for war in the late 1930s, Winston Churchill reactivated the corvette class, needing a name for smaller ships used in an escort capacity, in this case based on a whaling ship design. The generic name "flower" was used to designate the class of these ships, which – in the Royal Navy – were named after flowering plants.

Corvettes commissioned by the Royal Canadian Navy during the Second World War were named after communities for the most part, to better represent the people who took part in building them. This idea was put forth by Admiral Percy W. Nelles. Sponsors were commonly associated with the community for which the ship was named. Royal Navy corvettes were designed as open sea escorts, while Canadian corvettes were developed for coastal auxiliary roles which was exemplified by their minesweeping gear. Eventually the Canadian corvettes would be modified to allow them to perform better on the open seas.

Construction
Shediac was ordered 22 January 1940 as part of the 1939-1940 Flower-class building program. She was laid down by Davie Shipbuilding & Repairing Co. Ltd. at Lauzon, Quebec on 5 October 1940 and launched on 29 April 1941. She was commissioned on 8 July 1941 at Quebec City.

During her career, Shediac two significant refits. The first took place from April to July 1943 at Liverpool, Nova Scotia. Her second major overhaul began in mid-June 1944 and lasted until mid-August, taking place at Vancouver, British Columbia. During this second refit, Shediac had her fo'c'sle extended.

War duty
After arriving at Halifax for deployment, Shediac was briefly assigned to Halifax Force. In October 1941, she joined Newfoundland Command, escorting convoys between St. John's and Iceland. Shediac participated in the battles for convoy SC 48, convoy SC 67 and convoy ON 92 before assignment to Mid-Ocean Escort Force (MOEF) group C1. Beginning in July 1942  Shediac was assigned to the Western Local Escort Force (WLEF). She returned to MOEF in October 1942.

After returning from her first major refit, Shediac rejoined WLEF as a member of escort group W-8. She remained with this group until she transferred to the Pacific coast.

Shediac arrived at Esquimalt, British Columbia 10 May 1944. She departed for refit in June. She remained with the Pacific Fleet until the end of the war.

Trans-Atlantic convoys escorted

Post-war service

Shediac was paid off at Esquimalt 28 August 1945 after the end of hostilities. She was sold for mercantile use as Dutch civilian Jooske W. Vinke in 1954, . She was scrapped in September 1966 at Santander, Spain by Recuperaciones Submarines S.A.

References

1941 ships
Flower-class corvettes of the Royal Canadian Navy
Shediac